Melanospiza is a genus of Neotropical birds in the tanager family Thraupidae.

Taxonomy and species list
The genus Melanospiza  was introduced in 1897 by the American ornithologist Robert Ridgway with the Saint Lucia black finch as the type species. The name combines the Ancient Greek melas  meaning "black" and spiza meaning "finch". Although traditionally placed with the buntings and New World sparrows in the family Emberizidae, molecular phylogenetic studies have shown that the genus is a member of the tanager family Thraupidae and belongs to the subfamily Coerebinae which also contains Darwin's finches.

The genus contains the following two species:

References

 
Bird genera
Taxa named by Robert Ridgway